Information or info is the resolution of uncertainty, or a collection of related data or knowledge about a topic.

Information may also refer to:
 Information sign, a board or placard giving local information, or pointer to a tourist information source

 Information technology, the means of processing, storage, or transmission of data
 Information theory, the mathematical theory of information and communication
 Information (formal criminal charge), a formal criminal charge made by a prosecutor without a grand-jury indictment

Books 
 Information: The New Language of Science, a 2003 book by Hans Christian von Baeyer
 The Information (novel), by Martin Amis (1995)
 The Information: A History, a Theory, a Flood, a 2011 book by James Gleick

Companies 
 Dagbladet Information, a Danish newspaper
 The Information (website), a subscription-based digital media company

Music

Albums 
 Information (Berlin album), 1980
 Information (Dave Edmunds album), 1983
 The Information (Beck album), 2006
 Information, a 1997 album by Classified
 Information, a 1995 album by Toenut
 Information, an EP by Eliot Sumner

Songs 
 "Information" (Dredg song), 2009
 "Information", by Gwen Stefani, an unreleased song
 "Information", by Spirit, from the album The Adventures of Kaptain Kopter & Commander Cassidy in Potato Land

Related disambiguation articles
 Info (disambiguation)
 Inform (disambiguation)
 Information source (disambiguation)

See also 
 Data, or data used in computing
 Directory assistance, a phone service used to find out a specific telephone number and/or address of a residence, business, or government entity
 Fisher information, in statistics
 Help desk, an information service point
 Point of information (competitive debate)
 Philosophy of information